[[File:Putin Kukli.jpg|200px|thumb|upright|Puppetss puppet of Vladimir Putin, which was shown in his 2000 autobiography, On Behalf Of the First Person. Talks With Vladimir Putin.]]Puppets''' (lit. "dolls") was a weekly Russian TV show of political satire, produced by Vasily Grigoryev and shown on Saturdays on the TV channel NTV.  It used puppets to represent celebrities, mainly the major politicians. It was inspired by the French show Les Guignols de l'info.

The show was well loved in Russia and has inspired spinoffs in other countries.  President Vladimir Putin was frequently represented in the show.

Closure
During parliamentary elections in 1999 and presidential elections in 2000, NTV was critical of the Second Chechen War, Vladimir Putin and the political party Unity backed by him. In the puppet show Puppets in the beginning of February 2000, the puppet of Putin acted as Little Zaches in a story based on E.T.A. Hoffmann's Little Zaches Called Cinnabar, in which blindness causes villagers to mistake an evil gnome for a beautiful youth.  This provoked a fierce reaction from Putin's supporters. On 8 February the newspaper Sankt-Peterburgskie Vedomosti published a letter signed by the Rector of St. Petersburg State University Lyudmila Verbitskaya, the Dean of its Law Department Nikolay Kropachyov and some of Putin's other presidential campaign assistants that urged the prosecution of the authors of the show for what they considered a criminal offence.

NTV was forced to close the show down in 2002 after pressure from the Kremlin.

The only Russian president that didn’t appear on the show was Dmitry Medvedev.

Spitting in Russian
On January 1, 2010 the programme Spitting in Russian was broadcast by BBC Radio 4. Presented by Roger Law, co-creator of Spitting Image'', it recounts how Russian programme-makers came to London to learn the art of making political puppets, and how the programme came to an end.

 BBC Radio 4: Spitting in Russian

Legal controversies
The show's producing team was involved in several legal controversies.

Viktor Shenderovich, a satirist and a writer for the show, has claimed that an unnamed top government official required NTV to exclude the puppet of Putin from the show.  Accordingly, in the following episode, called "Ten Commandments", the puppet of Putin was replaced with a cloud covering the top of a mountain and a burning bush.

References and footnotes

NTV (Russia) original programming
1990s Russian television series
2000s Russian television series
1994 Russian television series debuts
2002 Russian television series endings
Russian satirical television shows
Russian television shows featuring puppetry
Political satirical television series
Cultural depictions of Vladimir Putin
Russian political satire
Television controversies in Russia